Aganju (known as Agayú or Aganyú in Spanish speaking counties) is an Orisha. He is syncretized with Saint Christopher in the Cuban religion known as Santería. In Yoruba language, aginjù (not Aganjú) means a wilderness, inhospitable habitat or impenetrable locale. 

Aganju is strongly associated with Shango. In some traditions Aganju is described as Shango's father; in other traditions he is described as Shango's brother. Both Shango and Aganju were, at one time, rulers of the Oyo empire who became deified.

Yoruba religion

In the Yoruba areas of Nigeria and Benin Republic, Aganju is known as a deified warrior king from the town of Shaki in the present-day Oyo State of Nigeria. He was said to walk with a sword and is said to fight by shooting fire, as opposed to Sango who fights with thunderstones and lightning. Shaki is in the savannah area of northern Yorubaland that has monoliths and boulder outcroppings.

Santería (Lucumí/Regla de Ocha)

In Cuba, Aganju is a volcano deity for the practitioners of Santeria/Lucumi religion. But there are no volcanoes in either Cuba nor Yorubaland, nor is Aganju associated with volcanoes among the Yoruba people. However, the Biu Plateau in the highland area of Northeastern Nigeria contains a number of extinct volcanoes. These extinct volcanoes have long been extinct and they are also far from Yorùbáland geographically. It is most likely that the association of Aganjú with volcanoes in Cuba is not older than the last century among creoles. And this due to Aganjú's supposed temperament couple with the relationship with Oroíña of Cuban Orisa faith (Ọ̀rànmíyàn in Yorùbá language).

Candomblé

In the Afro-Brazilian tradition of Candomblé, Aganjú is worshiped as a manifestation or quality of the Orisha Shango, often called Xango Aganjú. Aganjú represents all that is explosive and lacking control. He is also nicknamed "Xangô menino" among Candomblé practitioners.

Further reading
 Jo Anna Hunter. Ìyánifá Ọmó̩tinúwẹ̀, “My Journey to Aganjú: The Orisa so Hard to Find “ BlackMadonnaEnterprises.com and Oro Pataki Aganju: A Cross Cultural Approach Towards the Understanding of the Fundamentos of the Orisa Aganju in Nigeria and Cuba,  In Orisa Yoruba God and Spiritual Identity in Africa and the Diaspora, edited by Toyin Falola, Ann Genova. New Jersey: Africa World Press, Inc.

Yoruba gods
Yoruba mythology
Brazilian deities
Earth gods
Fire gods
Sea and river gods
Volcano gods